Ryan Evans (born 27 March 1987) is an English professional golfer. In 2017 he won the Turkish Airlines Challenge on the Challenge Tour.

Amateur career
Evans won the 2014 Lake Macquarie Amateur, was runner-up for the 2013 St Andrews Links Trophy, and medalist at the 2014 Australian Amateur.

Professional career
Evans was invited to play in some events on the Challenge Tour in 2015.  He finished the year at 28th in the rankings, with a best finish of T-3 at the Kärnten Golf Open. He earned his 2016 European Tour card through qualifying school.

Evans qualified for the 2016 Open Championship through Final Qualifying; he finished in 58th place. Later in the season he finished tied for third place in the D+D Real Czech Masters.

Evans returned to the Challenge Tour in 2017 and won the Turkish Airlines Challenge by four strokes from Tapio Pulkkanen. He finished the season 8th in the rankings to earn a place on the European Tour in 2018. He qualified for the 2018 U.S. Open as an alternate, after missing out at the fourth extra hole of a playoff in sectional qualifying at Walton Heath.

Amateur wins
2012 South of England Amateur
2013 Berkshire Trophy, Biarritz Cup
2014 Lake Macquarie Amateur, Avondale Amateur Medal

Source:

Professional wins (1)

Challenge Tour wins (1)

Results in major championships

CUT = missed the half-way cut
"T" = tied

Team appearances
Amateur
European Amateur Team Championship (representing England): 2014
Eisenhower Trophy (representing England): 2014
St Andrews Trophy (representing Great Britain and Ireland): 2014 (winners) 
Bonallack Trophy (representing Europe): 2014 (winners)

See also
2015 European Tour Qualifying School graduates
2017 Challenge Tour graduates

References

External links

English male golfers
European Tour golfers
Sportspeople from Kettering
People from Corby
1987 births
Living people